The Mbanja worm lizard (Chirindia ewerbecki), also known commonly as Ewerbeck's round-headed worm lizard, is a species of amphisbaenian in the family Amphisbaenidae. The species is endemic to Tanzania. There are two recognized subspecies.

Etymology
The specific name, ewerbecki, is in honor of German customs official Karl Ewerbeck, who collected the holotype.

Geographic range
C. ewerbecki is found in extreme southeastern Tanzania.

Habitat

Reproduction
C. ewerbecki is oviparous. The adult female lays a single egg.

Subspecies
Two subspecies are recognized as being valid, including the nominotypical subspecies.
Chirindia ewerbecki ewerbecki 
Chirindia ewerbecki nanguruwensis 

Nota bene: A trinomial authority in parentheses indicates that the subspecies was originally described in a genus other than Chirindia.

References

Further reading
Broadley DG, Gans C (1978). "Southern forms of Chirindia (Amphibaenia, Reptilia)". Annals of Carnegie Museum 47: 29–51. 
Loveridge A (1962). "New worm-lizards (Ancylocranium and Amphisbaena) from southeastern Tanganyika territory". Breviora (163): 1–6. (Amphisbaena nanguruwensis, new species, pp. 5–6).
Spawls S, Howell K, Hinkel H, Menegon M (2018). Field Guide to East African Reptiles, Second Edition. London: Bloomsbury Natural History. 624 pp. .
Werner F (1910). "Über neue oder seltene Reptilien des Naturhistorischen Museums in Hamburg. II. Eidechsen". Jahrbuch der Hamburgischen Wissenschaftlichen Anstalten 27 (supplement 2): 1–46. (Chirindia ewerbecki, new species, p. 37). (in German).

Chirindia
Reptiles described in 1910
Endemic fauna of Tanzania
Reptiles of Tanzania
Taxa named by Franz Werner